Ubiquitin-fold modifier conjugating enzyme 1 is a protein that in humans is encoded by the UFC1 gene.

Function

UFC1 is an E2-like conjugating enzyme for ubiquitin-fold modifier-1 (UFM1; MIM 610553) (Komatsu et al., 2004 [PubMed 15071506]).[supplied by OMIM, Mar 2008].

References

Further reading